Cyril Romain Andresen (23 November 1929 – 12 September 1977) was a Danish competitive sailor and Olympic medalist. He won a silver medal in the Dragon class at the 1956 Summer Olympics in Melbourne, together with Ole Berntsen and Christian von Bülow.

References

External links
 
 
 

1929 births
1977 deaths
Danish male sailors (sport)
Sailors at the 1956 Summer Olympics – Dragon
Olympic sailors of Denmark
Olympic silver medalists for Denmark
Olympic medalists in sailing
Medalists at the 1956 Summer Olympics